Ayodele Basil, better known as Del B, is a Nigerian (composer) sound engineer, record producer. and songwriter. He is best known for producing Kcee's hit single "Limpopo", which went on to be voted Song of The Year at the 2013 edition of The Headies. In 2012, he produced the single "Shake" by Flavour N'abania, which received critical acclaim among music critics.

Early life and career
Del B was born in Kano State, Northern Nigeria, to parents who are natives of Kwale. Prior to achieving recognition, he worked as a studio engineer at MidiCorp Studios. While there, he produced D'banj's "Why Me" single. He recorded the chart-topping single by Kcee entitled "Limpopo"—the song that got him nominated at the 2013 Headies. He produced two songs: "Kind Love" and "On Top Your Matter" off Wizkid's critically acclaimed studio album, Ayo. "On Top Your Matter" was met with positive reviews among music critics. It debuted at number nine on the MTV Base Official Naija Top 10 music video chart. It subsequently went on to top the charts for several weeks, earning Del B more recognition.

Del B has been credited as producer on studio albums including Seyi or Shay by Seyi Shay; Testify by Harrysong; Ghetto University by Runtown; Take Over by Kcee; The Baddest by Davido; Blessed and Thankful by Flavour N'abania; and Ayo by Wizkid. Del B showed his versatility as a singer and producer after he released a single titled "Too Proud" in 2012 and went on to be featured on a song titled "So Nice", by DJ Neptune, in 2015.

Del B Own A Website in May 2020 With The Name Del B World. From The Website, You can Watch And Listen to His Now YouTube Videos And Songs. Visit "Del B  Official Website" www.delbworld.com.

Ayodele Basil Net Worth 
Ayodele Basil is estimated to have a net worth of about $650,000

Ayodele Basil Personal Life 
A very social person, Del B is currently not married.

Ayodele Basil Age 
Ayodele Basil is 34 years old.

Production style
Micheal Abimboye of Premium Times describes Del B's style of production as a kind of production that “allows the artiste to actually use their pipes and show-off their vocal abilities”.

Awards and nominations

References

Living people
Nigerian hip hop record producers
21st-century Nigerian musicians
People from Kano State
Year of birth missing (living people)